Rob Massam (born 29 October 1987) AKA The Thing on The Wing, is a Wales international rugby league footballer who plays as a er for the North Wales Crusaders in Betfred League 1.

He has previously played for the Rochdale Hornets. He was a key player for Chester Gladiators, and was selected to represent England Lionhearts in 2010 scoring the winning try in England's 34–30 win over Wales Dragonhearts in Somerset. He scored against Wales Dragonhearts again in 2011 in Caerphilly but was unable to stop the Welsh from winning 30-24 and lifting the trophy.

Representative
Massam qualifies for Wales through residency as he moved to Wrexham at a young age. Despite representing England at amateur level Massam was selected for the Wales 'train-on' squad for the Tri-Nations against England and France in 2012. He made his full début in that game.

In October and November 2013, Massam played in the 2013 Rugby League World Cup where he scored a try.

In October 2014, Massam was selected to play in the 2014 European Cup but he withdrew before the tournament due to work commitments.

Honours
Massam was included in August's Cooperative Championship 1 Team of the Month, after becoming Crusaders leading try scorer for the 2012 season.

Personal life
Massam works as a personal trainer and is a qualified Biomechanics coach at Total Fitness in Wrexham and he has sponsored local rugby league club Wrexham Raiders for the 2012 season.

References

External links 
Rochdale Hornets profile
(archived by web.archive.org) Crusaders profile

1987 births
Living people
English rugby league players
North Wales Crusaders players
Rochdale Hornets players
Rugby league centres
Rugby league players from Wiltshire
Sportspeople from Salisbury
Wales national rugby league team players